Toleafoa Solomona Toailoa (also known as Maposua Solomona Toailoa) is a Samoan lawyer and politician. Toailoa gained notability as chairman of People Against Switching Sides (PASS), an organisation dedicated to campaigning against government legislation on changing the side of the road vehicles would drive on, which received significant media coverage in Samoa, as well as some coverage in Australia and New Zealand. PASS notably organised two protest marches, "the largest demonstrations in the nation's history".

In July 2008, Toailoa co-founded the People's Party, which grew out of PASS. In November, he was elected as the party's president, and confirmed that he would be running for Parliament, from the Vaimauga East constituency, in the 2011 general election. He contested the election, but was unsuccessful.

References

Samoan chiefs
Samoan politicians
Living people
Samoan lawyers
Samoan activists
Year of birth missing (living people)